Shahrak-e Sadd-e Nowruzlu (also Romanized as Shahrak-e Sadd-e Nowrūzlū; also known as Sadd-e Nowrūzlū) is a village in Zarrineh Rud-e Jonubi Rural District, in the Central District of Miandoab County, West Azerbaijan Province, Iran. At the time of the 2006 census, its population was 107, in 28 families.

References 

Populated places in Miandoab County